The Breeders' Cup Turf is a Weight for Age Thoroughbred horse race on turf for three-year-olds and up. It is held annually at a different racetrack in the United States or Canada as part of the Breeders' Cup World Championships. The race's current title sponsor is Longines.

The race is run at the European Classic distance of  miles, making it one of the most internationally appealing races on the Breeders' Cup lineup. One of the biggest moments in the race's history came in 2018 when Enable became the first horse to win both the Prix de l'Arc de Triomphe and Breeders' Cup Turf in the same year.

The forerunner for this race was the Washington, D.C. International Stakes at Laurel Park Racecourse. Inaugurated in 1952, it was raced on turf at  miles and drew the best horses from North America and Europe.

Automatic berths 
Beginning in 2007, the Breeders' Cup developed the Breeders' Cup Challenge, a series of races in each division that allotted automatic qualifying bids to winners of defined races. Each of the fourteen divisions has multiple qualifying races. Note though that one horse may win multiple challenge races, while other challenge winners will not be entered in the Breeders' Cup for a variety of reasons such as injury or travel considerations.

In the Turf division, runners are limited to 14 and there are up to 11 automatic berths. The 2022 "Win and You're In" races were:
 the Gran Premio Internacional Carlos Pellegrini, a Grade 1 race run in December at Hipódromo de San Isidro in Argentina
 the Grande Prêmio Brasil, a Grade 1 race run in June at Hipódromo da Gávea in Brazil
 the Prince of Wales's Stakes, a Group I race run in June at Royal Ascot in England
 the Takarazuka Kinen, a Grade 1 race run in June at Hanshin Racecourse in Japan
 the King George VI & Queen Elizabeth Stakes, a Group 1 race run in July at Ascot Racecourse in England
 the Del Mar Handicap, a Grade 2 race run in August at Del Mar Racetrack in California
 the Sword Dancer, a Grade 1 race run in August at Saratoga Race Course in upstate New York 
 the Irish Champion Stakes, a Group 1 race run in September at Leopardstown Racecourse in Ireland
 the Kentucky Turf Cup, a Grade 2 race run in September at Kentucky Downs in Kentucky
 the Prix de l'Arc de Triomphe, a Group 1 race run in October at Longchamps in France
 the Champion Stakes, a Group 1 race run in October at Ascot in England

Records

Most wins:
 2 – Conduit (2008, 2009)
 2 – High Chaparral (2002, 2003)

Most wins by a jockey:
 5 – Frankie Dettori (1999, 2001, 2006, 2010, 2018)

Most wins by a trainer:
 6 – Aidan O'Brien (2002, 2003, 2011, 2013, 2015, 2016)

Most wins by an owner:
 6 –  Sue Magnier, Michael Tabor & Derrick Smith (2002, 2003, 2011, 2013, 2015, 2016)

Winners 

† Indicates filly/mare

See also

Breeders' Cup Turf "top three finishers" and starters
 Breeders' Cup World Thoroughbred Championships
 American thoroughbred racing top attended events

References

External links
Official Breeders' Cup website
Three Great Moments: Breeders' Cup Turf at Hello Race Fans!

Turf
Open middle distance horse races
Grade 1 turf stakes races in the United States
Horse races in California
Graded stakes races in the United States
Turf races in the United States
Recurring sporting events established in 1984
1984 establishments in California